Chendar or Chandar may refer to:
Chandar, Kohgiluyeh and Boyer-Ahmad, a village in Iran
Chendar District, an administrative subdivision of Iran
Kuhsar, capital of the previous
Chendar Rural District, an administrative subdivision of Iran
Chandar of Sindh, Brahmin ascetic who succeeded his brother, Chach of Alor, as king of Sindh